New Belgian Front (FNB) is a Belgian nationalist political party.

The FNB was founded in 1996 by Marguerite Bastien, a former member of the Liberal Reformist Party (Parti réformateur libéral) and a candidate for the National Front (Front National) in the 1995 elections, but she was expelled from that party somewhat later. 

In 1999 Bastien was elected to the Brussels Parliament. She was expelled from the party though in 2001, and sat her term out as an independent.

Two other members of the party were elected to the Walloon Parliament in 2000. Currently the party is led by François-Xavier Robert.

Platform
The platform of the FNB is nationalist, with anti-immigration and law and order themes.

External links
  www.fnb.be
  www.fnb.to

Francophone political parties in Belgium
Far-right political parties in Belgium